Saguitar is a studio album by Alvin Lee released in 2007 by Repertoire Records Records (CD No: RAR 1004, 
EAN: 4009910000427).

Track listing
 "Anytime U Want Me" – 4:50
 "The Squeeze" – 4:07
 "It's Time To Play" – 4:23
 "Midnite Train" – 2:17
 "Motel Blues" – 5:20
 "Only Here For The Ride" – 2:47
 "Memphis" – 2:02
 "Got A Lot Of Living To Do" – 3:05
 "Blues Has Got A Hold On Me" – 3:23
 "It's All Good" – 4:20
 "Education" – 4:30
 "Rapper" – 3:27
 "Smoking Rope" – 4:38
 "Rocking Rendezvous" – 4:38

Personnel 
Alvin Lee - guitar, vocals
Tim Hinkley - guitar on "Motel Blues"

References

Alvin Lee albums
2007 albums
Repertoire Records albums

bg:Saguitar